The House of Bolkiah is the ruling royal family of Brunei Darussalam. It is composed of the descendants of the 1st sultan Sultan Muhammad Shah and his family. The Sultan of Brunei is the head of state and absolute monarch of Brunei. He is also head of government in his capacity as Prime Minister.

Since independence from the British in 1984, only one Sultan has reigned, though the royal institution dates back to the 14th century. The Sultan of Brunei can be thought of as synonymous with the ruling House of Bolkiah, with descendency being traced from the 1st Sultan Muhammad Shah's brother the 2nd Sultan Ahmad through and his daughter Puteri Ratna Kesuma, the wife of the 3rd Sultan Sharif Ali, a Sayyid and grandson of Emir Rumaythah ibn Abi Numayy of Mecca. The 13th Sultan Abdul Hakkul Mubin was an exception to familial succession, but he ascended after murdering the 12th Sultan Muhammad Ali and was in turn killed by the 14th Sultan Muhyiddin. It is not clear when the house became known as the 'House of Bolkiah', and whether it was named after the current 29th Sultan Hassanal Bolkiah, or the 5th Sultan Bolkiah.

Title

The full title of the Sultan is: His Majesty The Sultan and Yang Di-Pertuan of Brunei Darussalam (Kebawah Duli Yang Maha Mulia Paduka Seri Baginda Sultan dan Yang di-Pertuan Negara Brunei Darussalam).

Today, the surname Bolkiah is carried by any descendant of the House of Bolkiah. Members of the royal household  hold high and influential positions in government.

Sons and grandsons of Sultan Hassanal Bolkiah are referred to in the style "His Royal Highness" (HRH) or "Pengiran Muda" in Malay, differing from the royals belonging to the cadet branches which are addressed as "The Lord" (HH) or "Pengiran Anak" in Malay.

Members
The core of the Brunei Royal Family is made up of the immediate family of the incumbent Sultan of Brunei;
 Sultan Hasannal Bolkiah and Queen Saleha
 Princess Rashidah Bolkiah
 Princess Muta-Wakillah Bolkiah
 Crown Prince Al-Muhtadee Billah and Crown Princess Sarah
 Prince Abdul Muntaqim
 Princess Muneerah Madhul
 Prince Muhammad Aiman
 Princess Faathimah
 Princess Majeedah Bolkiah
 Princess Hafeezah Bolkiah
 Prince Abdul Azim (d. 24 October 2020)
 Prince Abdul Malik
 Princess Azemah Ni'matul Bolkiah
 Princess Fadzilah Lubabul Bolkiah
 Prince Abdul Mateen
 Prince Abdul Wakeel
 Princess Ameerah Wardatul Bolkiah

Only Hassanal Bolkiah and his two sons; Al-Muhtadee Billah and Abdul Mateen carry out government duties full-time, mainly for the Prime Minister's Office and the Royal Brunei Armed Forces. The Sultan's sister, Princess Masna Bolkiah, is the current Ambassador-At-Large to the United Nations representing the Brunei government and the only extended royal member to be part of the working royals.

Other members of the royal family with royal rank who do not carry out official duties are the Sultan's siblings, and their children are considered to be part of the lesser royal members;
 Prince Mohammad Bolkiah
 Prince Sufri Bolkiah
 Prince Jefri Bolkiah
 Princess Norain Bolkiah
 Princess Umi Kalthum Al-Islam Bolkiah 
 Princess Amal Rakiah Bolkiah
 Princess Amal Nasibah Bolkiah
 Princess Amal Jefriah Bolkiah

List of Sultans

See also
 List of Sultans of Brunei
 Line of succession to the Bruneian throne

References

 
Brunei
Hashemite people
Alid dynasties
Bruneian people of Arab descent